Shi Hui may refer to:

Shi Hui (Three Kingdoms) (165–227), third son of the Han dynasty warlord Shi Xie
Shi Hui (Duke of Fan), Zhou dynasty general
Shi Hui (actor) (1915–1957), Chinese actor and film director
Shi Hui (施惠), one of the possible authors of the 14th-century Chinese novel Water Margin